Hail the King is the debut album by reggae singer Fantan Mojah. It features the single "Hail the King", as well as a collaboration with Jah Cure entitled "Nuh Build Great Man".

Track listing
Hail The King
Feel The Pain
Nuh Build Great Man (with Jah Cure)
Corruption
Hungry
Thanks & Praise
Love Grows
She Makes Me Feel So Nice
Rastafari Is The Ruler (with Mr. Flash)
Uplift Yourself (with First Born)
Search
Hail The King (remix)
Don't Bow Out
Murderer
Kings Of Kings
Corruption - (remix)
Authentic Love (with Mr. Flash)
Will I See You Again

References

2005 albums
Fantan Mojah albums